Thomas Strong House is a historic home located at Wainscott in Suffolk County, New York. It is a -story, L-shaped, gable-roofed, cedar shingle clad structure originally built about 1695 and continually lived in by eight generations of Thomas Strong's descendants.

It was added to the National Register of Historic Places in 2005.

References

Houses on the National Register of Historic Places in New York (state)
Houses completed in 1883
Houses in Suffolk County, New York
National Register of Historic Places in Suffolk County, New York